Stuart Harold "2-D" Pot is a fictional English singer, musician and member of the British virtual band Gorillaz. He provides the lead vocals and plays the keyboard for the band. 2-D's singing voice is provided by Blur frontman Damon Albarn on Gorillaz' recordings and performances; his speaking voice was provided by actor Nelson De Freitas in various Gorillaz direct-to-video projects such as Phase One: Celebrity Take Down and Phase Two: Slowboat to Hades. In 2017, Kevin Bishop was cast as the new speaking voice of 2-D. He was created by Albarn and Jamie Hewlett in 1998.

Development

Characterization 
2-D was loosely based on Chris Gentry from the Britpop band Menswear and a mutual friend of Jamie Hewlett and Damon Albarn named Stuart Lowbridge, who has worked as a stage engineer for Albarn since the early days of his career. Before co-creating Gorillaz, Hewlett originally had the idea of forming a cartoon band called "Sour Grapes" with Gentry and Graham Coxon of Albarn's other band Blur. 2-D has been described by Gorillaz' former drummer and writer Cass Browne as being a "composite of Chris, Damon, and lots of other rock frontmen". 2-D was originally created as a representation of the "classic stupid pretty boy singer" stereotype that Hewlett found to be in many bands at the time and was the first character that Hewlett and Albarn created for Gorillaz in 1998, making his first official appearance in Gorillaz' debut EP Tomorrow Comes Today in 2000. He has been described in the Tomorrow Comes Today EP's booklet as being "a sweetheart with a blank sheet of paper where a brain should be".

Albarn has stated that Gorillaz' sixth studio album The Now Now is "in the world of 2-D", mentioning that the idea behind the album was to make an album of songs from 2-D's perspective.

Voice 
While 2-D's singing voice is provided by Gorillaz co-creator Damon Albarn, his speaking voice is provided by actor and comedian Kevin Bishop. Albarn has claimed that 2-D's singing voice was developed from a vocal effect produced by equipment in his studio that he has said is "not Auto-Tune, but it was an early form of synthetic voice". Gorillaz engineer Stephen Sedgewick says of the effect, "The main lo-fi telephone-like effect is the typical 2-D sound...I can't tell you what it is, but it's done with hardware. The plug-ins on the inserts are a Waves Renaissance De-esser and RVox, and the Waves Kramer PIE [compressor], which I use a lot on vocals." 2-D's main musical characteristic has been described by Albarn as being abstract and esoteric dystopian lyrics that are often recited through spoken word Sprechgesang.

In contrast to his singing voice, 2-D's speaking voice is high-pitched and squeaky, and at one point he had a speech impediment and a strong lisp due to his missing teeth. Although he is from the West Sussex region of England, 2-D speaks in a mockney accent rather than a Sussex dialect. In his first spoken appearances on the press release interview CD "The Apex Tapes", 2-D's speaking voice was originally portrayed as being lower and softer than the high-pitched, wheezy speaking voice that the character later developed. In Gorillaz' first American press interview (an interview with Rolling Stone), Albarn and Hewlett attempted to provide the speaking voices of 2-D and bandmate Murdoc Niccals, as they had not yet chosen proper voice actors for the characters, but Albarn gave up and the act was dropped after three questions. After this, Nelson De Freitas was chosen as the speaking voice of 2-D. In 2017, De Freitas was replaced by actor and comedian Kevin Bishop, who was suggested by Harry Enfield after declining an offer to voice the character.

Fictional history 
Stuart Pot was born on 23 May 1978 to David and Rachel Pot. The original surname of Stuart's father was "Tusspot", but he legally changed it to "Pot", shortly before Stuart was born.

His father, David, works as a mechanic and as a fairgrounds worker, while his mother, Rachel, works as a nurse. He was born in Hertfordshire, England and grew up there until he and his family had to move to Crawley, West Sussex, England where he attended St Wilfrid's Catholic School after he broke his piano teacher's hand and caused a lawsuit. When he was 11 years old, Stuart was involved in an accident where he fell from a tree and hit his head. This caused all his natural brown hair to shed, until it eventually grew back in a deep azure blue color. The accident also caused him to experience frequent migraines, for which his mother supplied him with painkillers.

At age 19, Stuart was hit in the face by Murdoc Niccals when he crashed his Vauxhall Astra into Uncle Norm's Organ Emporium in an attempt to raid the store of its musical equipment. This caused Stuart to receive hyphema in his left eye and put him into a coma. Murdoc was then arrested and sentenced to 30,000 hours of community service, as well as to care for the now comatose Stuart for ten hours a week. Not long after, Murdoc injured Stuart again while pulling off 360 donuts to impress a small crowd of women. Stuart came crashing through the windshield of the car and fractured his other eye. After the incident, he woke up from his vegetative state and was given the nickname "2-D", which refers to the two dents in his head. He was then recruited by Murdoc and chosen to be the lead vocalist of a new band he was forming after his last band had broken up. Gorillaz call the day 2-D and Murdoc first crossed paths "D-Day".

In 1998, 2-D began dating a woman named Paula Cracker, who eventually also joined 2-D as a member of Gorillaz and began to take on the role of the lead guitarist after he and Murdoc moved into Kong Studios. Paula was quickly removed from the band's lineup after being caught having a sexual affair with Murdoc in the Kong Studios bathroom, and she was then eventually replaced on guitar by a child prodigy named Noodle. The band was ready to launch and played their very first gig in 1998 soon after. Following the release and worldwide success of Gorillaz, 2-D and his bandmates soon moved to Los Angeles, California after being approached by a famous Hollywood director who was interested in making a Gorillaz movie. In a meeting between the band members regarding potential concepts for a Gorillaz film, 2-D was choked out by Murdoc, who was then punched in the face by Russel Hobbs in his defense. Gorillaz split up immediately after this event. After 2-D relocated back to England, he worked at his father's amusement park in Eastbourne and made friends with former Boyzone member Shane Lynch and Brian Setzer of Stray Cats. After Gorillaz had been off 2-D's mind for quite some time, he returned to Kong Studios after receiving a text from Noodle that informed him that she had started work on demos for a new Gorillaz album and needed him on vocals.

After the release of Demon Days proved to be a worldwide success and further catapulted Gorillaz' popularity, Noodle was then presumed dead in the aftermath of the music video for "El Mañana", which caused 2-D and Russel to spiral into a panic and depart from the band yet again. 2-D eventually moved on from Gorillaz and relocated to an apartment in Beirut, where Murdoc later tracked him down and kidnapped him against his will to bring to his newly built island to rejoin Gorillaz for the band's third album, Plastic Beach. During Gorillaz' 2010 Escape to Plastic Beach World Tour, 2-D made a Gorillaz album himself called The Fall. After the tour, Plastic Beach was shot down by pirates and the band again parted ways. In Gorillaz' 2016 interactive short story "The Book of 2-D", it was revealed that 2-D hid underwater following the pirate attack on Plastic Beach and was eventually swallowed alive by a whale that later died and was washed ashore, freeing 2-D soon afterwards on an island with no food except for the whale's blubber and the island's sand. After being stranded for months, 2-D sighted a plane flying above him. Moved to tears by this revelation, he set off on its direction, hoping to find a sign of civilization. After following the planes direction for 23 minutes, he soon realized he was actually in the middle of a beach rave on the island of Guadalupe off the west coast of Mexico. 2-D was soon flown back to Heathrow Airport in the United Kingdom, and upon arrival, a man offered him a ride to West London, where he reunited with Murdoc at Studio 13 and later be joined by Russel and Noodle to begin recording Humanz, Gorillaz' first studio album since 2010.

After the success of Humanz, Murdoc was revealed to be incarcerated at Wormwood Scrubs prison in an acceptance speech from the band during the 2018 Brit Awards. It was also revealed soon afterwards that Gorillaz had made an album called The Now Now without contributions from Murdoc, who was replaced by Ace from Cartoon Network's animated series The Powerpuff Girls while he was in prison. 2-D became the temporary leader of Gorillaz during the making of The Now Now and was in charge of the musical direction of the band for the album. Murdoc's incarceration led 2-D to gain a significant boost in self-esteem, to the point of appearing to be rude and developing an increasingly overinflated ego. Immediately after Murdoc's return, 2-D appears to have returned to his usual self.

On 24 September 2019, Gorillaz revealed through social media that 2-D had again been on vacation in Beirut and sent a postcard to his bandmates in which he makes a reference to parts he gathered for a machine that was later revealed to be the Song Machine, the latest audiovisual project from Gorillaz. In season one of Song Machine, 2-D is oblivious to the various attempts made by Murdoc to distract him as he tries to gain access to portals in the newly relocated Kong Studios after he and the rest of the band leave him behind as they use it for a trip. 2-D is the host of all of the interviews in Song Machines accompanying "Machine Bitez".

Personality 
2-D was created by Jamie Hewlett to represent the "stupid pretty boy singer" he identified as a part of many manufactured bands at the time. As such, 2-D is lacking significantly in intelligence and critical thinking skills as a result of various head injuries and brain damage that he's experienced throughout his life. Because of this, he can also come across as being very awkward at times. He has been described by his ex-girlfriend Paula Cracker in Rise of the Ogre as being "very sweet...[but] a bit thick though". He is often ridiculed by bandmate Murdoc for his perceived stupidity and ignorance. He was oblivious to Murdoc's frequent abuse and admired him regardless, looking up to him as a big brother figure and displaying symptoms of acute stockholm syndrome. His bandmate Russel has once stated that 2-D is "kind of like a pet. Obedient, eager to please. Eats a lot of dog food". 2-D is also absent-minded and daydreams frequently, often spacing out for no apparent reason. He is clumsy and accident-prone, having received many injuries throughout his life. His hyphema has resulted in a vision impairment which further affected his clumsiness. He has been a Buddhist since discovering the Tibetan independence movement and shares a zen-bond with bandmate Noodle.

Physical appearance 
2-D's physique is tall and skinny; his hands and feet are large and he has long limbs, with his height standing at 6'2". The character has pale skin and spiky azure blue hair. Thereafter, he is also depicted with a notable lack of visible pupils in his eyes due to the blood leakage from his hyphema; while his eyes can range from black to white, they predominately remained black throughout the first four phases. However, since The Now Now, 2-D's eyes have been almost exclusively white.  Additionally, he is also shown to be missing a few front teeth, and has sometimes been shown wearing a golden tooth. As with the rest of the Gorillaz characters, 2-D has thick, bushy, rectangular eyebrows. In Gorillaz artwork, 2-D's hair was darker and the spikes on his hair were thicker and sharper than they would become in much of the artwork for Demon Days and Plastic Beach, where his hair became messier and brighter and the spikes became thinner and looser, to the point where he now appears to have a mildly receding hairline in some artwork for Humanz and The Now Now. He also has blue bags under his eyes. He has a pointy chin and head shape that looks similar to that of fellow band member Noodle.

Styles 
Although primarily presented through 2D animation, 2-D and the rest of Gorillaz sometimes appear in the form of 3D animation, such as in the music videos for "Stylo", "Strobelite", and "Sleeping Powder", as well as several live visuals, such as the visual for their performance of "Dirty Harry" at the 2006 Brit Awards and in interludes and promotional content for the 2010 Escape to Plastic Beach Tour. The motion capture 3D models of 2-D from the Humanz album campaign typically show him wearing the same outfit he wore in the music video for "Saturnz Barz". On the Humanz album cover, 2-D appears in the form of a photorealistic 3D model along with the rest of the characters. He appears as an 8-bit character in the visualizer for "Garage Palace", and for the 8-bit icons of the characters that appear in the Humanz Tour, The Now Now Tour, and the Gorillaz documentary Reject False Icons. The music video for "Tranz" occasionally portrays 2-D in the form of both a 3D model and stop motion claymation in certain sections of the video. 2-D and Murdoc appeared together as puppets made by The Jim Henson Company at Jim Henson's Creature Shop in Gorillaz' 2006 performance at the Apollo Theater in Harlem and for their appearance at the 2006 Webby Awards, played by The Muppets puppeteers Matt Vogel and Joey Mazzarino respectively.

Age 
2-D and the other Gorillaz characters have been illustrated as aging progressively with each new Gorillaz release. 2-D was originally in his early 20s when Gorillaz was released, but has since gotten older and is in his early 40s as of 2018. Since Humanz, 2-D has gained wrinkles and a receding hairline. He has also developed more defined wrinkles on his hands. His nose has also changed shape since Humanz, appearing to be somewhat more pointed than it was before. Although he has aged somewhat over time, as the "pretty boy singer" of the group, 2-D generally has a youthful appearance with clear skin and little to no facial hair and few blemishes or wrinkles, even maintaining this look into his 40s.

Fashion 
Along with the other Gorillaz members, 2-D's wardrobe changes very frequently and he is rarely depicted wearing the same clothing twice. This was a conscious decision from Jamie Hewlett to make the characters feel more realistic and stand apart from most other cartoon characters, who rarely if ever change their clothes. His wardrobe typically consists of a wide range of T-shirts and skinny jeans with Converse Chuck Taylor All-Stars, although he is often depicted in a long-sleeved shirt, sweatshirt, or jacket and boots as well. In the Gorillaz era of the band, 2-D's T-shirts were typically graphic tees that featured a distinct printed graphic, an element that became less prominent starting in the Demon Days album campaign, where he typically wore plain short-sleeved T-shirts over long sleeved shirts. In the Plastic Beach era of the band, 2-D typically wore sleeveless shirts or a short-sleeved T-shirt and grey pants with a pair of boots, and he often wore a bandana and a clown mask or sea captain hat. In the Humanz era of Gorillaz, 2-D was most frequently depicted in wardrobe inspired by the Black Panther Party and the Sandinista National Liberation Front and The Now Nows artwork mostly showed 2-D in various sweatshirts and leather jackets.

Role in Gorillaz 
As the frontman of Gorillaz, 2-D's main roles in the band entail serving as both the lead vocalist and keyboardist. While he can play other instruments (as can the other Gorillaz members), he generally focuses on his role as vocalist and keyboardist for most of the band's discography. Exceptions to this include the 2018 Gorillaz album The Now Now, where 2-D is often depicted playing guitar, and 2010's The Fall, which 2-D created largely by himself. In most cases, 2-D's singing voice sounds significantly different than his normal speaking voice. His vocal range is very wide, and he has sung everything from baritone to falsetto. Gorillaz co-creator Damon Albarn provides all of 2-D's singing voice in their music, including songs where he provides spoken-word and rapped verses. 2-D apparently has had some influence in the lyric-writing process (as evidenced by the credits on the insert of the titular debut album) even though his intelligence is reputedly negligible. Apparently, Murdoc has been said to have had Albarn occasionally help teach 2-D to sing better than he already could, and apparently even sing in some of their songs, as stated in an NME interview with Albarn.

While Murdoc is usually portrayed as the main director behind most Gorillaz albums (or so he claims), 2-D is depicted as the member behind Gorillaz albums such as 2010's The Fall and 2018's The Now Now. 2-D also wrote and recorded Gorillaz' 2017 single "Sleeping Powder" by himself, with the music video for the song featuring him exclusively.

Other appearances

Music 
In 2003, 2-D was credited as a guest artist on the songs "Small Time Shot Away" by Massive Attack, and "FM" by Nathan Haines. He contributed additional guitar on several tracks on Spacemonkeyz' 2003 Gorillaz remix album Laika Come Home, as well as an additional stylophone solo on the "Slow Country" remix "Strictly Rubbadub". He also recorded vocals for the album's "M1 A1" remix "Lil' Dub Chefin'". It has been claimed by Murdoc in the "Gorillaz Are Ten" Spotify radio show that the original demo version of the Gorillaz song "Dirty Harry" called "I Need A Gun" from Damon Albarn's 2003 solo EP Democrazy is a duet between 2-D and Albarn.

Visual 
In 2001, 2-D became a spokesperson of the Free Tibet campaign after Gorillaz were asked by Adam Yauch of Beastie Boys to work with the organization, appearing in a short commercial for the campaign the same year. On 15 June 2012, an illustration of 2-D was designed by Jamie Hewlett in promotion of the Dalai Lama's visit to the United Kingdom. In 2017, 2-D appeared in an official advertisement campaign for the English professional football team Chelsea F.C. to launch their Chelsea F.C. Nike football kit with Chelsea player David Luiz. 2-D and the rest of Gorillaz appear on the back cover of Hewlett's 2017 art book, featured alongside characters from all of Hewlett's projects. On 23 October 2020, 2-D and Beck appeared on an episode of the online virtual talk show Animal Talking with Gary Whitta with Albarn and Hewlett as special guests as Animal Crossing avatars, in promotion of the Song Machine episode "The Valley of the Pagans".

2-D and Murdoc appear as the puppet versions of themselves from Demon Days Live in the 2006 Webby Awards to accept their "Artist of the Year" award. On 23 July 2020, 2-D appeared in a virtual Comic-Con panel for a short interview about Gorillaz Almanac. He performed a live duet with Albarn of the Song Machine song "Aries" for an episode of Jimmy Kimmel Live! on 20 May 2020.

References 

Animated characters introduced in 1998
Animated human characters
Fictional characters with psychiatric disorders
Fictional characters with speech impediment
Fictional drug addicts
Fictional English people
Fictional insomniacs
Fictional pianists
Fictional rock musicians
Fictional singers
Fictional vegan and vegetarian characters
Gorillaz members
Male characters in animation
Fictional characters invented for recorded music